KQYB (98.3 FM, “KQ98”) is a radio station  broadcasting a country music format. Licensed to Spring Grove, Minnesota, United States, the station serves La Crosse.  The station is currently owned by Mid-West Family Broadcasting.

Translators
In addition to the main station, KQYB is relayed by an additional two broadcast translators to its coverage area.

References

External links

Radio stations in Minnesota
Country radio stations in the United States
Radio stations established in 1980